{{Infobox presenter
| name        = Norm Hitzges
| image       = 
| imagesize   = 
| caption     = 
| birth_name  = Norman Richard Hitzges
| birth_date  = 
| birth_place = Dunkirk, New York
| show        = The Norm and D Invasion
| station     = KTCK 1310 AM
| network     = 
| timeslot    = 10:00 AM-12:00 PM (M-F)
| show2       = 
| station2    = KLIF
| network2    = 
| timeslot2   = 
| style       = Sports Talk, Humor
| country     = United States
| prevshow    = The Norm Hitzges Show
| parents     = 
| spouse(s)   = Mary Hitzges (née Danz) m. 2011, Vicki Hitzges (nee Robinson) m. 1983"
| children    = Two stepsons
| website     = 
}}

Norm Hitzges (born July 5, 1944) is an American author and sports talk radio host.  He is a member of the Texas Radio Hall of Fame.
Career
Hitzges hosts at KTCK (1310 AM / 96.7 FM, "SportsRadio 1310 The Ticket") in Dallas.  Hitzges pioneered radio sports talk in the morning at KLIF radio at a time when sports talk was mainly on in the evening. Hitzges moved to (former rival) KTCK in early 2000 after 15 years at sister station KLIF when the latter removed sports talk programming from its lineup. Hitzges also serves as the television play-by-play voice of the Dallas Sidekicks.

He has also provided major league baseball commentary for ESPN. Hitzges is known for his enthusiasm and knowledge of sports trivia and has been compared to Dick Vitale for his energy and love of sports. Hitzges has been honored by the Dallas All Sports Association and the Texas Baseball Hall of Fame.

Hitzges also hosts "Norm-A-Thon", a yearly 18-hour marathon broadcast to raise money for the Austin Street Center, a Dallas area homeless shelter. Hitzges has also been a long-time supporter of Texans! Can Academy, an organization that provides at-risk youths with education and training. 

Weekly segments on his show include “The Birdhouse,” “Shuttle Run,” “The Meatheads of the Week,” and “The Weekend-around.”

On August 7, 2020, Hitzges celebrated his 45th anniversary of sports talk radio.  During a call-in, Mark Cuban related that Norm's KLIF show was the first radio program streamed on the internet on his original radio simulcast platform, AudioNet (later Broadcast.com).  This required recording the show on an 8-hour VCR tape and then encoding the tapes onto a Packard-Bell PC to upload to the internet.

Personal life
Since 2010, Hitzges and his wife have lived in the Dallas suburb of Little Elm, Texas.
On August 27, 2020, Hitzges announced on the air that he is being treated for bladder cancer. Notable DFW media members were quick to show their support, including Fox 4's Mike Doocy. 

Partial bibliography
 Horizons in the Mirror (1971, Naylor Co.)
 Norm Hitzges Historical Sports Almanac (May 1991, Taylor Publishing)
 Essential Baseball: A Revolutionary New Method for Evaluating Major League Teams, Players, and Managers (with Dave Lawson, December 1994, Dutton)
 Greatest Team Ever: The Dallas Cowboys Dynasty of The 1990s'' (August 2007, Thomas Nelson)

References

External links
Norm's Clubhouse
Norm Hitzges' entry on The Ticket website

Living people
1944 births
American sports announcers
Major League Baseball broadcasters
Radio personalities from Dallas
Sportswriters from New York (state)
Sportswriters from Texas
Texas Rangers (baseball) announcers
Dallas Cowboys announcers
People from Little Elm, Texas
Major Indoor Soccer League (1978–1992) commentators